Prateik Babbar (born 28 November 1986) is an Indian actor and martial artist who predominantly appears in Hindi films. The son of actress Smita Patil and actor Raj Babbar, he began his career as a production assistant before pursuing an acting career. Prior to his screen debut, Babbar appeared in television advertisements for a variety of products, including Nestle KitKat, on the recommendation of the filmmaker Prahlad Kakkar. Since his debut in Bollywood, Babbar has received accolades such as a Filmfare Award and a Stardust Award.

Babbar made his screen debut with the 2008 coming of age drama Jaane Tu... Ya Jaane Na. He made his debut in Tamil language through Darbar. He garnered nominations at various award ceremonies including the Filmfares, Screen Awards, and the Stardust Awards for best debut, winning the last of the three. Babbar played a variety of roles in 2011, appearing in commercially viable projects such as the crime thriller Dum Maaro Dum and the political drama Aarakshan, while drawing the attention of critics for his performances in independent films, including the drama Dhobi Ghat and the romantic comedy My Friend Pinto. Following a number of box-office failures, he had his biggest successes with the thriller Baaghi 2 (2018), the comedy Chhichhore (2019) and the action drama film Darbar (2020).

Career
Babbar assisted advertisement filmmaker Prahlad Kakkar for a year as a production assistant. During this time Babbar was cast in advertisement films for several companies, including KitKat.

Babbar made his acting debut in the Aamir Khan production, Jaane Tu... Ya Jaane Na alongside Imran Khan and Genelia D'Souza. His portrayal of the annoying, attention-seeking brother of Genelia's character won him critical appreciation as well as numerous awards. At the 54th Filmfare Awards, Babbar received a Special Jury certificate, as well as nominations for Best Male Debut and Best Supporting Actor. The film went on to become a major commercial success.

Following this initial success, he appeared in films that earned him little recognition. In 2011, Babbar appeared in four films, the first of which was Kiran Rao's Dhobi Ghaat, which opened to positive reviews at film festivals worldwide. Babbar also featured in the action-thriller Dum Maro Dum alongside Abhishek Bachchan and Rana Daggubati, and in the Prakash Jha-directed social drama Aarakshan with Amitabh Bachchan, Saif Ali Khan and Deepika Padukone. Also, in 2011, he acted opposite Kalki Koechlin in My Friend Pinto. His subsequent films include Ekk Deewana Tha and Issaq, both of which underperformed at the box office. In 2014, he made Bengali film debut in film titled Auroni Taukhon with Paoli Dam.

After gaining sobriety over substance abuse, he attended acting school taking up a course in method acting at the Jeff Goldberg Studio in 2016. Babbar's first role after the course was in a short film entitled The Guitar. He made his feature film comeback with the comedy-drama Umrika, which opened at the 2015 Sundance Film Festival to a positive response. In 2017, he starred in a video titled "#DilSeAzaad", which highlighted the stigmas around addictions and addicts.

In 2018, he made a comeback with the film Baaghi 2, with Tiger Shroff in lead role, where Prateik for the first time portrayed an antagonist role as Sunny. He appeared in two more films; Anubhav Sinha's Mulk where he played Shahid Mohammed and Nitin Kakkar's Mitron.

In 2019, he appeared in a comedy-drama film, Chhichhore directed by Nitesh Tiwari and produced by Sajid Nadiadwala, a story of seven friends. He also appeared in the 2019 Tamil language action thriller film Darbar, written and directed by AR Murugadoss and produced by Allirajah Subaskaran starring Rajinikanth. The film was a major commercial success.

As of September 2019, he has four upcoming films under various stages of production Brahmastra, Yaaram, and Sanjay Gupta's gangster film Mumbai Saga.

Early life
Babbar was born on 28 November 1986 and is the son of the actor-politician Raj Babbar and the actress Smita Patil. His mother died due to complications in childbirth when Prateik was born. Prateik was raised by his maternal grandparents in Mumbai. He has said in interviews that he had a strained relationship with his father while growing up, as his father was "always busy with his other family". However, he also said that he and his father reconciled after Prateik grew to adulthood.

Prateik's stepmother is the actress Nadira Babbar and his half-siblings are Arya Babbar and Juhi Babbar, also actors.

Personal life
In 2011, during the filming of Ekk Deewana Tha, he began a relationship with Amy Jackson, a British actress. They broke up the following year.

Following a battle with substance abuse in 2013, a problem that Babbar had struggled with in the past, he went through rehab and counseling and has stayed sober since.

Babbar married film producer, Sanya Sagar, on 23 January 2019 after dating for quite a few years. However, the couple separated in 2020 and divorced in January 2023.

Filmography

Films

Television

Web series

Awards and nominations

References

External links

 
 

1986 births
21st-century Indian male actors
Male actors in Hindi cinema
Filmfare Awards winners
Indian male film actors
Living people
Marathi people
Male actors from Mumbai
Punjabi people